Rokitki  is a settlement in the administrative district of Gmina Somonino, within Kartuzy County, Pomeranian Voivodeship, in northern Poland.

References

See also
History of Pomerania

Rokitki